Heybridge Basin is a village and civil parish about 1 mile from Maldon, in the Maldon district, in the county of Essex, England. In 2018 the built up area (which includes Osea Island) had an estimated population of 732. The parish was formerly part of Heybridge parish, on 1 April 2020 it became a separate parish.

Heybridge Basin is where the Chelmer and Blackwater Navigation Canal merges into the tidal Blackwater Estuary, fed by the rivers Blackwater and Chelmer. The two rivers are joined by a lock which is regularly used by pleasure boats. The Basin was constructed in 1796. By 1799 there was a hamlet. Heybridge Basin was designated a conservation area on 21 January 1975. The conservation area has 8 grade II listed buildings.

The Heybridge Basin area was struck by an F0/T1 tornado on 23 November 1981, as part of the record-breaking nationwide tornado outbreak on that day.

Amenities 
Heybridge Basin has a church called St George's Church on Basin Road, a pub called The Jolly Sailor on Goldhanger Road. and a pub called the Old Ship. There is also a tea room, 'the lock' operated by Wilkin and Sons, the conserves company. The basin offers walks along the seawall and the canal leading back into the heart of Heybridge itself. During the summer months, rowing boat hire is also available.

References

External links 
 Parish Council

Villages in Essex
Civil parishes in Essex
Maldon District